Dr Reverend Peter Lusaka Chintala (b. - d. 11 February 2019 in Lusaka) was a Zambian politician and diplomat.

Biography 

Chintala was born in the Copperbelt Province and graduated in 1990 from the Talbot School of Theology in La Mirada, California with a Master of Arts degree in theology. He died on 11 Febrbruary 2019  after undergoing medical treatment at Coptic Hospital in Lusaka Whilst Chairman and General Secretary of the Zambian Baptist Association, Chintala pastored two churches in Ndola, and in 1992 set up Free Baptist Churches of Zambia acting as President. In 1994, the Board of Trustees of Biola University awarded him a Doctorate of Divinity.

Chintala was selected as the Movement for Multi-Party Democracy candidate for the Kabushi constituency in a by-election in 1992, and was elected with a 2,386-vote majority. He was subsequently appointed Deputy Minister of Youth, Sport and Child Development. Chintala was re-elected in the 1996 general elections with a 7,871-vote majority. In 1997 he was appointed Deputy Minister for Religious Affairs in State House, a ministry he was in charge to set up.

In May 2001 he was appointed Minister of Youth, Sport and Child Development, succeeding to Syacheye Madyenkuku. However, in the December 2001 general elections he was defeated by Nedson Nwowa of the Heritage Party.

On 5 March 2004, President Levy Mwanawasa appointed Chintala Ambassador of Zambia to Russia. He presented his credentials to President of Russia Vladimir Putin on 5 October 2004. Resident in Moscow, Chintala has concurrent accreditation as ambassador of Zambia to Albania, Armenia, Azerbaijan, Belarus, Georgia, Kazakhstan, Kyrgyzstan, Moldova, Tajikistan, Turkmenistan, Ukraine and Uzbekistan.

Peter Chintala died on 11 February 2019 at Coptic Hospital in Lusaka.

References 

Year of birth missing (living people)
Living people
Talbot School of Theology alumni
Members of the National Assembly of Zambia
Movement for Multi-Party Democracy politicians
Sport, Youth and Child Development ministers of Zambia
Zambian Baptists
Ambassadors of Zambia to Russia
Ambassadors of Zambia to Albania
Ambassadors of Zambia to Armenia
Ambassadors of Zambia to Azerbaijan
Ambassadors of Zambia to Georgia (country)
Ambassadors of Zambia to Kazakhstan
Ambassadors of Zambia to Kyrgyzstan
Ambassadors of Zambia to Moldova
Ambassadors of Zambia to Tajikistan
Ambassadors of Zambia to Turkmenistan
Ambassadors of Zambia to Ukraine
Ambassadors of Zambia to Uzbekistan